is a Japanese politician of the Liberal Democratic Party, a member of the House of Representatives in the Diet (national legislature). A native of Futenma, Okinawa and graduate of Asia University, he served in the city assembly of Ginowan, Okinawa for three terms. He was elected to the first of his four term in the assembly of Okinawa Prefecture in 1996 and then to the House of Representatives for the first time in 2005. In the meantime, he ran unsuccessfully for the mayor of Ginowan in 2003.

See also 
 Koizumi Children

References

External links 
 Official website in Japanese.

1956 births
Living people
People from Okinawa Prefecture
Koizumi Children
Members of the House of Representatives (Japan)
Liberal Democratic Party (Japan) politicians